Ady or ADY may refer to:

People 
 Adi (name), Hebrew-language given name
 Ady (surname)
 Ady An (born 1980), Taiwanese actress
 Ady Berber (1913–1966), Austrian actor
 Ady Jean-Gardy, Haitian journalist
 Ady Schmit (born 1940), Luxembourgian footballer
 Ady Spencer (born 1973), English rugby league player
 Ady Stern, Israeli physicist
 Ady Williams (born 1971), English footballer
 Ady (footballer) (born 1973), Tunisian footballer

Other uses
 Adi (disambiguation)
 Ady, Oregon
 Ady, Texas
 Aadi (album), a 2005 album by Syrian singer Asalah Nasri
 Adyghe language
 Alldays Airport, Alldays, Limpopo, South Africa
 Azerbaijan Railways (Azeri: , ADY).